American used vehicle exporting is a grey-market international trade involving the exporting of used vehicles from the United States to international markets.

It's reported that $8 billion worth of used American vehicles were exported in 2021.

History
In 2015, Carfax issued a warning that used American vehicles exported to Europe may have questionable conditions. Many of them, however, were exported to Lithuania with repairs made there because of the cheap price prior to being sold elsewhere in the EU.

In October 2020, it was reported that most used American-made vehicles are exported to United Arab Emirates as the top export market, followed by Nigeria, Georgia, Mexico, Jordan, Ukraine, Cambodia and the Dominican Republic. In 2021, American vehicles were also exported to Oman, Guatemala, Lithuania and Germany.

Due to sanctions placed on Russia after the start of the Russian-Ukrainian War in 2022, Russians have opted to purchase American vehicles in Georgia since car plants in the country were closed in order to comply with sanctions.

Restrictions

References

External links 
 2018 Edition of the Automotive Resource Guide: A Reference for U.S. Exporters

Export
Automotive industry in the United States
Foreign trade of the United States
Used car market